OP50 may refer to:

 Op. 50 (disambiguation), several opuses
 a strain of Escherichia coli used for maintenance of Caenorhabditis elegans cultures